The Big Ten Conference has been playing softball since 1982 when the Big Ten Conference softball tournament was established to decide its champion.  The Big Ten then began league play the following season in 1983 while eliminating the tournament until 1995.  The tournament ran again from 1995 to 2008 and then again from 2013 to present day, which is used to determine the league's automatic bid to the NCAA Division I Softball Championship while the regular season determines the conference champion.

Champions
These are the official Big Ten champions based on standings.  1982 was the only year the conference tournament was used to determine the champion.  After that, the regular season determined the champion while the tournament held from 1983 to 1994 and 2009-13 was used only to determine the automatic bid into the NCAA Division I softball tournament.

Championships by school

An asterisk (*) indicates a shared (regular season) Big Ten championship.

See also
List of Big Ten Conference baseball champions

References

Champions
Big Ten Conference

Recurring sporting events established in 1982